The acronym WUP could refer to:
 the Western Upper Peninsula of Michigan
 the Western University of Pennsylvania
 the Worker-communism Unity Party of Iran
 the Wesleyan University (Philippines)
 the Writers' Union of the Philippines
 WUP, the product code used by Nintendo for Wii U hardware and software